Tampa Bay Hawks was an American soccer team, founded in 2000, who were members of the United Soccer Leagues Premier Development League (PDL), the fourth tier of the American Soccer Pyramid, until 2002, after which the team left the league and the franchise was terminated.

The Hawks played their home games at Putnam Park in the city of Palm Harbor, Florida, 25 miles west of downtown Tampa. The team's colors were green and white.

Year-by-year

Soccer clubs in Florida
H
Defunct Premier Development League teams
2000 establishments in Florida
Association football clubs established in 2000
Sports in Pinellas County, Florida
2002 disestablishments in Florida
Association football clubs disestablished in 2002